William "Jesse" Ramey (January 28, 1891 – May 26, 1963) is a vintage master carver of fish decoys.  His work is sometimes attributed to "Jess Ramey", though he was known to his friends as Jesse (his actual middle name).  His work, along with Oscar W. Peterson's, formed the basis of what is now considered the "Cadillac style".

Ramey primarily carved decoys for himself and some friends.  His output was very limited and therefore his pieces are considered fairly rare, even in highly used condition.

His pieces have been seen in the following museum exhibits:
 “Fishing for Art, an Exhibition of the Implements and Art of Angling” American Museum of Fly Fishing at the Addison Gallery of American Art, 3/17/1984 - 4/15/1984
 “Gone Fishin ... an Exhibition of the Art & Artifacts of Angling” - Leelanau Historical Museum 6/11/1989-1/29/1990.
 “Hooked on Wood, The Allure of the Fish Decoy” The Center for Art in Wood, Philadelphia PA 5/12/2012 - 7/21/2012.

Early life 

William Jesse Ramey was born January 28, 1891, to Fleming Ramey and Latisha E Musser Ramey in Greenup County, Kentucky.  They moved to Michigan during his childhood and he married Gertrude May Yager in Antrim County on August 11, 1910.

Carving
Jesse was considered a master woodworker and even taught carving classes at the nearby CCC Camp Wellston where his son (Charlie Ramey) was enrolled.  Not only did Jesse make fish decoys, for which he is remembered, he also carved plaques for family members and a few duck decoys.

Even though he continued to carve until his death on May 26, 1963 of a ruptured appendix, his works are still fairly scarce.
His production was mainly for personal usage and for friends and that is possibly why his work is noted for the high level of detail including carving of the gills under the body and the complete painting of all the fins.

Influence
Ramey's fish carvings were primarily carved in the "Cadillac style", although there is a fine example of a large decorative piece on fishdecoy.com which employs an inserted tail.  The Cadillac style is one in which a decoy is carved from a single piece of wood in a cradle or "U" shape.  The tail is curved, either left or right, so that when attached to a line the fish decoy will "swim" in circles like a wounded fish.  Metal fins and line ties are inserted into the wood and are held by the cast lead weights.  These metal fins allow the fisherman to bend them so that the swim pattern can be modified.  Multiple holes in the line ties allow the fish to swim differently as well since the head may float higher or lower depending upon the position the line is tied.  Oscar W. Peterson and Jesse Ramey were among the first to employ this design which became a standard style of the many fish decoy makers in the Cadillac Michigan area.  Jim & Al Nelson, Jim Pullen, George Aho, Don Johnson, Dilbert Edwards, Arnold "Hook" Peterson, Al Williams, Ken Hill, Tom Richards, Dale Goodrich, and Jerry Finch are just a few of the carvers who have employed the "Cadillac Style".

A number of transitional and contemporary fish decoy carvers have directly attributed Jesse Ramey's work as being an influence on their style.  CB Lewis goes so far as to call out Jesse Ramey's influence on his website (goldenagedecoys.com).  Jim Nelson, Al Nelson, Dan Nelson, and Delbert Edwards  are all related to Jesse so his influence was probably unavoidable.

It has been said that Jesse Ramey may have been influential to Oscar W. Peterson's work.  In describing some of the Ramey decoys in his book, Steven Michaan states:  

Regardless of the amount of influence, there is no doubt that Jesse Ramey was critical in the development of the "Cadillac Style" of fish decoy carving.

Reference books 
Books that reference some of "Jesse" Ramey's work and may contain minor details about his life:

Articles that deal with Fish Decoys and Mention Jesse Ramey

References

External links
Wayside Chapel (Jesse Ramey's page)

Folk artists
1891 births
1963 deaths
American woodcarvers
Fishing equipment
20th-century American sculptors
20th-century American male artists
American male sculptors
People from Greenup County, Kentucky
Sculptors from Kentucky
Sculptors from Michigan